Out of the Blue is an album by American saxophonist Sonny Red recorded in late 1959 and early 1960 and released on the Blue Note label. In 1996, it was released on CD, as a limited edition, with five bonus tracks from the same sessions.

Reception

The AllMusic review by Scott Yanow awarded the album 4½ stars and stated "Sonny Red, a fine altoist inspired by Charlie Parker and Jackie McLean, never really made it in jazz, and some of his recordings are rather uninspired. However, that does not hold true for his Blue Note album... He performs mostly little-known standards (along with six of his originals) and displays a fair amount of originality and a great deal of potential that was never really fulfilled. Recommended".

Track listing
All compositions by Sonny Red except as indicated

 "Bluesville" – 5:53
 "Stay as Sweet as You Are" (Gordon, Revel) – 6:16
 "I've Never Been in Love Before" (Loesser) – 5:24
 "Nadia" – 4:10
 "Blues in the Pocket" – 6:32
 "Alone Too Long" (Fields, Schwartz) – 3:00
 "The Lope" – 5:16
 "Stairway to the Stars" (Malneck, Parish, Signorelli) – 6:19

Bonus tracks on CD reissue:
"Crystal" – 5:38
 "Lost April" (DeLange, Newman, Hubert Spencer) – 6:49
 "You're Sensational" (Porter) – 6:30
 "Blues for Kokee" – 5:36
 "You're Driving Me Crazy" (Donaldson) – 5:27

Personnel
Sonny Red – alto saxophone
Wynton Kelly – piano
Sam Jones (tracks 1–6), Paul Chambers (tracks 7–13) – bass
Roy Brooks (tracks 1–6), Jimmy Cobb (tracks 7–13) – drums

Charts

References

Blue Note Records albums
Sonny Red albums
1960 albums
Albums recorded at Van Gelder Studio